Artona is a genus of moths of the family Zygaenidae.

Selected species
Subgenus Artona
Artona flavipuncta 
Artona fulvida 
Artona hainana 
Artona superba 
Subgenus Balataea Walker, [1865]
Artona angusta (Alberti, 1954)
Artona cuneonotata (Leech, 1898)
Artona elegantior (Alberti, 1954)
Artona funeralis (Butler, 1879)
Artona gracilis (Walker, [1865])
Artona gracilis gracilis (Walker, [1865])
Artona gracilis taiwana Wileman, 1911
Artona intermediana (Alberti, 1954)
Artona kimurai M. Owada & Inada, 2005
Artona martini Efetov, 1997
Artona octomaculata (Bremer, 1861)
Artona parilis Efetov, 1997
Artona uniformis (Alberti, 1954)
Artona walkeri (Moore, 1859)
Subgenus Pseudosesidia Alberti, 1954
Artona aegeriaeformis Alberti, [1954]

References
 , 1954: Über die stammesgeschichtliche Gliederung der Zygaenidae nebst Revision einiger Gruppen (Insecta, Lepidoptera). Mitteilungen aus dem Zoologischen Museum der Humboldt-Universität Berlin, 30: 115–480.
 , 1995: An annotated check-list of the Palaearctic Procridinae (Lepidoptera: Zygaenidae), with descriptions of new taxa. Entomologist's Gazette 46: 63-103.
  & , 2012: A check-list of the Palaearctic Procridinae (Lepidoptera: Zygaenidae). CSMU Press, Nata. Abstract: .

Procridinae
Zygaenidae genera